Melaleuca phratra is a plant in the myrtle family, Myrtaceae and is endemic to Queensland in Australia. (Some Australian state herbaria use the name Callistemon phratra.) It is a large shrub similar to Melaleuca paludicola but has flower spikes that are a shade of pink.

Description
The leaves usually have some thickening at the mid-vein and prominent oil glands.

The filaments of the stamens are pink with a yellow anther.

Taxonomy and naming
Melaleuca phratra was first formally described in 2009 by Lyndley Craven in Novon. The specific epithet (phratra) is from the Greek word phratra meaning "clan" or "brotherhood" referring to the similarity of this species to M. paludicola, M. quercina and M. sabrina.

Callistemon phratra is regarded as a synonym of Melaleuca phratra by the Royal Botanic Gardens, Kew.

Distribution and habitat
This melaleuca occurs in and between the Injune and Texas districts in Queensland. It grows along creek banks.

References

phratra
Flora of Queensland
Plants described in 2009
Taxa named by Lyndley Craven